Hyderabad airstrike refers to the killing of many Afghan civilians including women and children in the village of Hyderabad, Gerishk District, Helmand province, Afghanistan on June 28, 2007 by the United States Army.

The airstrikes occurred after Taliban forces ambushed a combined US-Afghan army force in Hyderabad and destroyed two US military vehicles with mines. A firefight ensued and US-Afghan forces called in airstrikes in response to heavy small arms and mortar fire. Coalition spokesperson Major Chris Belcher stated the airstrikes targeted Taliban firing positions in the village.

The numbers of casualties vary depending on the source. Some give total numbers as high as 130 with up to 80-100 civilians killed.

President Hamid Karzai ordered an investigation. Residents of the town of Hyderabad claimed that from 45 to 65 civilians were killed. An investigation by the Afghan government concluded that 45 civilians including women and children had been killed. Village elders say another 23 civilians were wounded in the attack.

See also
Azizabad airstrike 78-92 civilians mostly children killed in Herat province, 2008
Deh Bala wedding party bombing 47 civilians mostly children killed in Nangarhar province, 2008
Narang night raid 10 Afghan civilians mostly school boys were killed on December 27, 2009.
Granai airstrike 86-145 civilians, mostly children killed in Farah province, 2009
 Uruzgan helicopter attack 27-33 civilians killed in Orūzgān province, 2010

References

External links 
45 civilians, mostly women and children were killed in NATO airstrike (Photos)
Troops in contact": airstrikes and civilian deaths in Afghanistan Human Rights Watch
'Bomber McNeill' reveals the 'Cheapness' of Afghan lives: the massacre in Haydarabad, Helmand

Massacres in Afghanistan
2007 in Afghanistan
Mass murder in 2007
Airstrikes during the War in Afghanistan (2001–2021)
Civilian casualties in the War in Afghanistan (2001–2021)
History of Helmand Province
June 2007 events in Asia
Attacks in Afghanistan in 2007
2007 airstrikes